Al-Aziziyah, is a district of Al-Hasakah, Syria.

References

Districts of Al-Hasakah